Western Hutt was a New Zealand parliamentary electorate from 1969 to 1996.

Population centres
Through an amendment in the Electoral Act in 1965, the number of electorates in the South Island was fixed at 25, an increase of one since the 1962 electoral redistribution. It was accepted that through the more rapid population growth in the North Island, the number of its electorates would continue to increase, and to keep proportionality, three new electorates were allowed for in the 1967 electoral redistribution for the next election. In the North Island, five electorates were newly created (including Western Hutt) and one electorate was reconstituted while three electorates were abolished. In the South Island, three electorates were newly created and one electorate was reconstituted while three electorates were abolished. The overall effect of the required changes was highly disruptive to existing electorates, with all but three electorates having their boundaries altered.

The main population centre in the electorate was the city of Lower Hutt in the Hutt Valley.

History
The electorate partly replaced the Hutt seat, which had been held by Trevor Young (who went to the Eastern Hutt seat), and Western Hutt was won in 1978 by John Terris for the Labour Party.

In the 1990 election the seat was won by Joy McLauchlan of the National Party; one of several seats won by National at the 1990 general election. McLauchlan was re-elected in 1993.

In 1996 the seat was replaced by the Hutt South seat, which was won by Trevor Mallard of the Labour Party.

Members of Parliament
Key

Election results

1993 election

1990 election

1987 election

1984 election

1981 election

1978 election

1975 election

1972 election

1969 election

Notes

References

Historical electorates of New Zealand
Lower Hutt
1969 establishments in New Zealand
1996 disestablishments in New Zealand
Politics of the Wellington Region